"Tell Me Why" is a song by British girl group, the Spice Girls, appearing as the second track on their third studio album Forever (2000). 
The song was written by Victoria Beckham, Melanie Brown, Emma Bunton, Rodney Jerkins, LaShawn Daniels, Fred Jerkins III and Mischke Butler. Jerkins and Daniels produced the song. It was released as a promotional single in December 2000. Originally planned as the second single from Forever, the release was scrapped.

Background

After the Spice Girls released "Goodbye" as their first single without member Geri Halliwell in 1998, the group took a break and came back to a recording studio in mid-1999, when Rodney Jerkins signed up to give their then-upcoming new album a tougher sound. Jerkins said, "I went out to dinner with a couple of the Spice Girls about a month and a half ago and they told me that they want me to, you know, do some work on their album, so I'm planning on going to London at the end of January, early February to work on the album, so it should be cool. I'm ready for it", adding that he hoped to bring an "urban, danceable" feel to the project: "It will still have a pop appeal, but the beats will be a little harder".

Release
"Tell Me Why" was released in December 2000 as one of the three songs picked as promotional singles from the Spice Girls' third studio album, along with "If You Wanna Have Some Fun" and "Weekend Love". In January 2001, Virgin Records commissioned several remixes for the song including remixes from Thunderpuss and Jonathan Peters. The remixes for the proposed second single of Forever were not commercially released due to the "disappointing" sales of the parent album. While the planned single release of the song was scrapped.

"Tell Me Why" (Jonathan Peters edit) would later be commercially released as a bonus track in November 2007, on the deluxe edition of the group's Greatest Hits album.

The song was performed in the 2012–13 jukebox musical Viva Forever!, which is based on the songs of the Spice Girls.

Composition

"Tell Me Why" was written by the members of the group Victoria Beckham, Melanie Brown and Emma Bunton, along with Rodney Jerkins, LaShawn Daniels, Fred Jerkins III and Mischke Butler, while production was handled by Jerkins and Daniels. The song is one of the three Spice Girls album tracks that Melanie C didn't receive a writing credit. It is described as a "sparse, uptempo slice of R&B, flecked with chattering electronics" by Alexis Petridis by The Guardian. In March 2019, Bunton stated that the song was about Geri Halliwell adding "we were writing songs, we were being very honest and open."

Critical response
James Hunter of Rolling Stone called the song as a "silky, spiky danceability" track. Anne T. Donahue of Vulture criticized the song and described it as attempt of the Spice Girls at throwing "shade" at Geri Halliwell who was a former group member at the time. J.D. Considine of The Baltimore Sun described the track as an "itchy, keyboard-driven pulse." Dorian S. Ham of The Lantern called the song as a "right tune with its jerky guitar driven beat", and describing it as a "fairly entertaining imitation" of an upbeat Mariah Carey song.

Format and track listing
Promotional CD
 "Tell Me Why"  – 3:42
 "Tell Me Why"  – 3:39
 "Tell Me Why"  – 10:55
 "Tell Me Why"  – 3:22
 "Tell Me Why"  – 9:19

Credits and personnel
Credits adapted from the liner notes of Forever.

Victoria Beckham – lyrics, vocals
Melanie Brown – lyrics, vocals
Emma Bunton – lyrics, vocals
Melanie Chisholm – vocals
Rodney Jerkins – lyrics, production, music, audio mixing
LaShawn Daniels – lyrics, vocal production
Fred Jerkins III – lyrics
Mischke Butler – lyrics
Paul Foley – recorder
Ben Garrison – audio mixing

Published by EMI Full Kneel Music/EMI Blackwood Inc./Rodney Jerkins Productions Inc./EMI April Music Inc./LaShawn Productions Inc./Ensign Music Corp./Fred Jerkins Publishing.

Release history

References

2000 songs
British contemporary R&B songs
Song recordings produced by Rodney Jerkins
Songs written by Emma Bunton
Songs written by Fred Jerkins III
Songs written by LaShawn Daniels
Songs written by Mel B
Songs written by Rodney Jerkins
Songs written by Victoria Beckham
Spice Girls songs